Georgia State Route 60 is a state highway from east of Braselton to the Tennessee state line in McCaysville

Georgia State Route 60 could also refer to:

 Georgia State Route 60 (1921–1926): a former state highway that existed from Sterling to south-southwest of Darien
 Georgia State Route 60 (1930–1940): a former state highway that existed from Social Circle to southeast of the city

060 (disambiguation)